FCGR3B (Fc fragment of IgG, low affinity IIIb, receptor), also known as CD16b (Cluster of Differentiation 16b), is a human gene.

Clinical relevance
Mutations and copy-number variations in this gene have been associated to clinical cases of glomerulonephritis.

See also 
 CD16
 Cluster of differentiation

References

Further reading

External links 
 

Clusters of differentiation
Fc receptors